Jemal Inaishvili (born November 11, 1962 in Kobuleti, Georgia) is the Deputy Chairman of the Parliament of Georgia.

References

External links
www.parliament.ge 
gcci.ge 

1962 births
Living people
Members of the Parliament of Georgia
People from Kobuleti